Big Kahuna's Water and Adventure Park is a water park located in Destin, Florida, which opened in 1986. The park is primarily a water park, with over forty water attractions. The park also features several thrill ride attractions and a miniature golf course.

On Tuesday, July 16, 2019, Big Kahuna's lazy river was shut down by the Okaloosa County Health Department for unsanitary water conditions.

In 2022 parent company Boomers Parks would re-brand Sahara Sam's in West Berlin, New Jersey to Big Kahuna's Water Park.

References

External links
 

Buildings and structures in Okaloosa County, Florida
Tourist attractions in Okaloosa County, Florida
Water parks in Florida
1986 establishments in Florida
Palace Entertainment